Vara or VARA may refer to:

Geography
Vara (river), in Liguria, Italy
Vara Parish, former municipality in Tartu County, Estonia
Vara, Estonia, village in Peipsiääre Parish, Tartu County, Estonia
Vara Municipality, municipality in western Sweden
Vara, Sweden, town in Sweden
Batterie Vara, former German coastal fortress near Kristiansand, Norway, now Kristiansand Cannon Museum
 Las Varas (disambiguation), several places

People with the surname
Armando Vara (born 1954), Portuguese politician
Julián Vara (born 1983), Spanish footballer
Kathy Vara, American television anchor
Shailesh Vara, British Conservative Party politician

Films
Vara (film), a 2013 Kannada film starring Nidhi Subbaiah
 Vara: A Blessing, a 2013 Bhutanese film by Khyentse Norbu

Other uses
Vara, a seldom used Spanish and Portuguese unit of length
Portuguese customary units
Spanish customary units
Vara, a variety of the Central Banda language of the Central African Republic
 Vara, a variety of the Upper Morehead language of Papua New Guinea
Vara, list of Greyhawk deities, a fictional deity in the Dungeons & Dragons roleplaying game
A.S.D. Fo.Ce. Vara, former football club in Italy
VARA HF, a proprietary WinLink protocol for e-mail communications over amateur radio

Acronyms
Omroepvereniging VARA, a public broadcasting organization in the Netherlands
Visual Artists Rights Act, a law in the United States that protects artists' moral rights to attribution and the integrity of their work
Virgin Australia Regional Airlines, is an Australian regional airline based in Perth Australia

See also
Varus deformity, as in "tibia vara"
Vada (food), an Indian fried snack